Count Nikolai Petrovich Rumyantsev (3 April 1754 – 3 January 1826), born in Saint Petersburg, was Russia's Foreign Minister and Chancellor of the Russian Empire in the run-up to Napoleon's invasion of Russia (1808–12). He was the son of Field Marshal Pyotr Rumyantsev-Zadunaisky from the Rumyantsev comital family.

Background 
Rumyantsev and his brother were provided with basic education at home. Their mentor was Friedrich Melchior, Baron von Grimm. In 1774 they went to Leiden University where they studied history, law and language.

Official career 
Rumyantsev was the first envoy of Russia to the Holy Roman Empire after Russia became a guarantor of the imperial constitution through the Treaty of Teschen (1779). He arrived in 1782 accredited as ambassador to the Electoral Rhenish Circle, Upper Rhenish Circle, Swabian Circle, Franconian Circle, Electorate of Mainz, Electorate of Cologne, Palatine Zweibrücken, Duchy of Württemberg, Margraviate of Baden and Landgraviate of Hesse-Kassel. Although he acted as the representative of Russia as guarantor of the peace, he was considered by Germans to be a partisan of Austria.

During the first years of the 19th century, Rumyantsev was very influential with Alexander I and his mother Maria Fyodorovna, serving as Minister of Commerce (1802–1811) and President of the State Council (1810–1812).

As Foreign Minister (appointed 1808), he advocated a closer alliance with France. On receiving the news of Napoleon's invasion of Russia (1812), he suffered a stroke and lost his hearing. When Napoleon entered Moscow, he advised the Emperor to dismiss Kutuzov and to seek peace at any cost. Eventually Alexander lost all confidence in Nikolay Petrovich, who retired in 1814 just before the Congress of Vienna.

Nicholas Rumyantsev died on 3 January 1826 in his neo-Palladian palace on English Quay in St Petersburg. His statue stands in front of the Gomel Palace in Belarus.

Scholarly pursuits 

During the years of his foreign service, Nikolay Petrovich amassed a huge collection of historical documents, rare coins, maps, manuscripts, and incunabula which formed a nucleus of the Rumyantsev Museum in Moscow (subsequently transformed into the State Russian Library). Showing a keen interest in Russian history, Rumyantsev produced the first printed publications of several old Russian chronicles and ancient literary monuments of the Eastern Slavs. He presided over a circle of young antiquaries (such as Pavel Stroev and Ivan Snegirev) that later drifted into the Slavophile camp.

Rumyantsev also became a notable patron of the Russian voyages of exploration. He sponsored the first Russian circumnavigation of the globe. As a result, his name came to be attached to such exotic things as:
 Spiranthes romanzoffiana, a North American orchid
 Papilio rumanzovia, a large butterfly from the Philippines
 Syagrus romanzoffiana, the Queen or Coco Palm tree of South America
 Romanzoffia, a genus of flowering plants in the waterleaf family from North America
 Romanzovite, another name for grossular, a type of garnet stone
 between 1812 and 1842 the Russian name (залив Румянцева) for present day Bodega Bay, California
 the Romanzof Mountains in Alaska and Yukon territory
 Cape Romanzof in Alaska, itself giving its name to Cape Romanzof LRRS Airport
 Romanzov Island, now called Tikei
 Romanzoff Bay, in La Pérouse Strait
In 1811 he commissioned sculptor Canova to create a statue of peace in recognition of the peacemaking efforts of his family.

References 

1754 births
1826 deaths
Politicians from Saint Petersburg
People from Saint Petersburg Governorate
Russian nobility
Heads of government of the Russian Empire
Foreign ministers of the Russian Empire
Chancellors of the Russian Empire
Members of the State Council (Russian Empire)
Book and manuscript collectors
Holy Roman Empire–Russia relations